Byhalia may refer to:

 Byhalia, Mississippi
 Byhalia, Ohio